"Horse Power" is the fourth single by British electronic music duo The Chemical Brothers from their seventh studio album Further (2010). "Horse Power" was a promotional single only, with its radio edit clocking in at 2:56.

Release
The single cover uses the "horse" taken from the music video, also used for The Chemical Brothers covermount album. It was released to Australian alternative radio on 7 February 2011.

Music video
The music video is taken from the Further music video film, used to accompany the Further album.

Track listing
"Horse Power" (radio edit) – 2:56

References

2010 singles
2010 songs
The Chemical Brothers songs
Songs written by Tom Rowlands
Songs written by Ed Simons